Marquis Lucas (born March 25, 1993) is an American football offensive tackle for the New Orleans Breakers of the United States Football League (USFL). He played college football for the Mountaineers at West Virginia University.

Early years
Lucas attended Miami Central High School, where he played football at the right tackle position.

Professional career

Buffalo Bills
Lucas joined the Buffalo Bills as an undrafted free agent following the 2016 NFL Draft. He was released by the Bills on September 2, 2016.

Minnesota Vikings
On December 13, 2016, Lucas to the Minnesota Vikings' practice squad. He signed a reserve/futures contract with the Vikings on January 2, 2017. On May 4, 2017, he was waived by the Vikings.

Atlanta Falcons
On June 15, 2017, Lucas signed with the Atlanta Falcons. He was waived on August 19, 2017.

Tampa Bay Buccaneers
On August 20, 2017, Lucas was claimed off waivers by the Tampa Bay Buccaneers. He was waived on September 2, 2017 and was signed to the Buccaneers' practice squad the next day. He was placed on the practice squad injured list on September 6. He was released on October 6, 2017.

Orlando Apollos
In 2018, Lucas joined the Orlando Apollos of the Alliance of American Football. The league ceased operations in April 2019.

Tampa Bay Vipers
In October 2019, Lucas was drafted by the Tampa Bay Vipers in the 2020 XFL Draft. He had his contract terminated when the league suspended operations on April 10, 2020.

New Orleans Breakers
Lucas was selected in the 7th round of the 2022 USFL Draft by the New Orleans Breakers.

References

External links
West Virginia Mountaineers bio

1993 births
Living people
Players of American football from Miami
Miami Central Senior High School alumni
American football offensive tackles
West Virginia Mountaineers football players
Buffalo Bills players
Minnesota Vikings players
Atlanta Falcons players
Tampa Bay Buccaneers players
Orlando Apollos players
Tampa Bay Vipers players
New Orleans Breakers (2022) players